Greg Richmond (born July 15, 1981) is a Defensive Line Coach at the Oklahoma State University in Stillwater, Oklahoma.  Prior to OSU, he coached the defensive line at the nationally ranked D2 Fairmont State University in West Virginia. He played for 3 years in the National Football League as a linebacker signing as an undrafted free agent by the Philadelphia Eagles in 2004. He played college football at Oklahoma State University.

External links
Oklahoma State Football Coach staff page
OSU Strength and Conditioning staff page
Q&A with Greg Richmond
NFL.com player page

1981 births
Living people
Sportspeople from Oklahoma City
American football linebackers
Oklahoma State Cowboys football players
Philadelphia Eagles players
Oklahoma State Cowboys football coaches
Fairmont State Fighting Falcons football coaches